WLVP (870 AM) is a radio station broadcasting an adult standards and oldies format. Licensed to Gorham, Maine, United States, it serves southern Maine, including Portland.  Established in 1980 as WDCI, the station is owned by Robert Bittner through licensee Blue Jey Broadcasting Co..

History
The station went on the air March 3, 1980, as WDCI on 1590.  In the intervening years, the station would change its call letters to WASY and then WJBQ, the latter after coming into common ownership with WLAM (1470 AM) and WKZS (99.9 FM; now WTHT).  WJBQ moved to 870 kHz in 1988; on this frequency, the station became WKZN on November 28, 1989, and then swapped call letters with WLAM on December 26, 1990; the two stations eventually began simulcasting a standards format.

Wireless Talking Machine Company sold WLAM, 1470 (by then WZOU), and WLAM-FM (106.7 FM, which had launched in 1996 as an FM simulcast of the stations; it is now WXTP), along with 99.9 (by then WMWX) and WTHT (107.5 FM; now WFNK) to Harron Communications, then-owner of WMTW-TV, in 1999.  On May 7, 2001, Harron converted 870 and 106.7 to news/talk as WMTW.  The WLAM call letters were then returned to 1470, which initially retained the standards format; on November 26, the station was switched to a simulcast of WMTW; shortly afterwards, talk programming was removed from the stations in favor of an all-news format, mainly from the Associated Press's All-News Radio service.

After Harron sold its Maine radio stations to Nassau Broadcasting Partners in 2004, Newsradio WMTW was discontinued.  Nassau also introduced three separate formats to the stations. with WMTW switching to progressive talk from Air America Radio under the call letters WLVP.

Nassau first attempted to convert WLVP to ESPN Radio in September 2004; this sparked listener protest, prompting Nassau to initially postpone the format change to November 8 before canceling it entirely.  However, after significant changes occurred at Air America (including the departure of Al Franken), the station began airing ESPN Radio on June 1, 2007, resulting in WLVP and WLAM once again airing the same programming.

WLVP and WLAM dropped ESPN Radio on February 2, 2009, and switched to oldies.  In conjunction with the change, the stations began to simulcast WCSH's morning and early evening newscasts, a move made to continue the newscasts' availability via radio even after WCSH's own 87.7 MHz audio was discontinued following the shutdown of analog television signals.

Initially locally programmed, in early 2010 WLVP and WLAM became affiliates of The True Oldies Channel.  Additionally, on August 2, the station added The Jeff Santos Show from WWZN in Boston (marking a partial return to progressive talk programming); this in effect took WLVP's morning drive programming back to a news/talk format, as Santos' program immediately follows the simulcast of WCSH's morning newscast.  The stations' format was modified once more on August 6, 2011, when sports talk was readded to the weekend schedule via locally-produced shows from the Maine Sports Network (which previously provided some weekend programming to WJJB-FM).

WLVP, along with 16 other Nassau stations in northern New England, was purchased at bankruptcy auction by WBIN Media Company, a company controlled by Bill Binnie, on May 22, 2012. Binnie already owned WBIN-TV in Derry, New Hampshire. The deal was completed on November 30, 2012. On December 9, 2015, Binnie agreed to sell WLAM and WLVP to Blue Jey Broadcasting Company, controlled by Bob Bittner, for $135,000; the deal made WLVP a sister station to WJTO in Bath. The sale to Blue Jey Broadcasting was consummated on February 17, 2016. Upon takeover of WLVP and WLAM, the simulcast of WCSH news programming was discontinued.

Translator

References

External links

Oldies radio stations in the United States
Adult standards radio stations in the United States
LVP
Radio stations established in 1980
1980 establishments in Maine
Gorham, Maine
LVP